Omran Salem Saleh (Arabic: عمران سالم صالح; born 15 February 1997) is a Libyan professional footballer who plays as a midfielder and forward for Libyan Premier League club Al-Ittihad Tripoli and the Libya national team.

International career 
Salem made his debut for Libya in a 1–0 loss to Tunisia on 21 September 2019.

Honours 
Al-Ittihad Tripoli
 Libyan Cup: 2018

References

External links 
 
 

1997 births
Living people
Libyan footballers
Association football midfielders
Association football forwards
Libya international footballers
Al-Ittihad Club (Tripoli) players
Libyan Premier League players